Magan Singh Rajvi is a former Indian football player. He hails from Indian state of Rajasthan. He was part of the Indian football team which won bronze medal at the 1970 Asian Games. He also captained the Indian team in 1973 and 1974. He is one of the few and 6th hat trick scorer of India which he scored against Thailand on 23 July 1974 at 1974 Merdeka Cup.

Personal life
Magan Singh is a retired Superintendent of Police (RAC) Bikaner Range. He is from a village situated 60 km from Bikaner named Dheengsari. He is related to Maharaja Karni Singh of Bikaner, who won Arjun Awarda in 1961 in shooting. His elder brother Chain Singh Rajvi was also an illustrious and accomplished footballer who attended Indian Football team camp and was also the vice-captain of the famous RAC Bikaner Football Team of which Magan Singh was captain. He was additional Superintendent of Police.

International goals
FIFA "A" international statistics

Non FIFA statistics

Honours

India
Asian Games Bronze Medal: 1970
Merdeka Tournament third place: 1970

Individual
Received Arjuna Award in 1973 for his achievements as a football player.

See also 
 List of India national football team hat-tricks
 List of India national football team captains

References

Bibliography

External links 
Official list of Award winners
 List of award winners with AIFF

Year of birth missing (living people)
Living people
Rajasthani people
Indian footballers
People from Bikaner
Recipients of the Arjuna Award
Footballers from Rajasthan
Asian Games medalists in football
Footballers at the 1970 Asian Games
Footballers at the 1974 Asian Games
Asian Games bronze medalists for India
Association football forwards 
Association football midfielders
Medalists at the 1970 Asian Games
India international footballers
Mohun Bagan AC players
East Bengal Club players
Salgaocar FC players
Calcutta Football League players